Helluosoma is a genus of beetles in the family Carabidae, containing the following species:

 Helluosoma atrum Castelnau, 1867
 Helluosoma bouchardi Baehr, 2005
 Helluosoma hangayi Baehr, 2005
 Helluosoma longicolle Macleay, 1888

References

Anthiinae (beetle)